Water polo was contested for men only at the 2002 Central American and Caribbean Games in San Salvador, El Salvador.

References
 

2002 Central American and Caribbean Games
2002
2002 in water polo